Paul Anthony Chilton (born 21 October 1944) is a British cognitive linguist and discourse analyst known for his work on conceptual metaphor, cognitive stylistics, and political discourse. Chilton developed a three-dimensional model to analyze semantic structure in natural languages, basd on spatial cognition and using a formalism derived from vector geometry. This approach has been applied to discourse in terms of spatial, temporal, and modal dimensions.

Chilton is Professor Emeritus in the Department of Linguistics and English Language at the University of Lancaster.

Select publications 
 Orwellian Language and the Media (1988)
 Security Metaphors: Cold War Discourse from Containment to Common European Home (1996)
 Analysing Political Discourse: Theory and Practice (2004)
 Language, Space and Mind: The Conceptual Geometry of Linguistic Meaning (2014)
 Religion, Language, and the Human Mind (2018, ed. with Monika Kopytowska)

References 

Alumni of the University of Oxford
Linguists from the United Kingdom
1944 births
Living people
Discourse analysts